Buchanan County Courthouse is a historic courthouse located at St. Joseph, Missouri.  It was built in 1873, and is a cruciform plan, Renaissance Revival-style brick building.  It features pedimented porticos with Corinthian order columns and a glass and tin central dome.

It was first listed on the National Register of Historic Places as Buchanan County Courthouse and Jail in 1972.  Its boundaries were decreased in an amendment in 1978 and the NRHP listing was renamed as "Buchanan County Courthouse", apparently excluding the jail.

References

County courthouses in Missouri
Courthouses on the National Register of Historic Places in Missouri
Renaissance Revival architecture in Missouri
Government buildings completed in 1873
Buildings and structures in St. Joseph, Missouri
National Register of Historic Places in Buchanan County, Missouri